Jannewietske Annie de Vries  (born 11 November 1961 in Beetgum) is a Dutch politician. She was a member of the provincial executive of Friesland from 2007 to 2015.

Since 2018 she has been mayor of Súdwest-Fryslân.

References 

1961 births
Living people
20th-century Dutch women politicians
20th-century Dutch politicians
21st-century Dutch women politicians
21st-century Dutch politicians
Dutch civil servants
Dutch sports executives and administrators
Labour Party (Netherlands) politicians
Mayors in Friesland
People from Súdwest-Fryslân
Members of the Provincial-Executive of Friesland
Municipal councillors in Friesland
People from Menaldumadeel